Ezo'la is a Japanese animation brand.

Works

Television series

References

External links

 
Japanese animation studios